Jacques-Paul Spifame de Brou, born in Paris in 1502 and died 25 March 1566 in Geneva, was a French prelate who converted to be a Calvinist during the 16th century.

Family
Jacques-Paul Spifame de Brou was the son of Jean, lord of Passy and Bisseaux, secretary of the king, treasurer of the Extraordinaire des Guerres, and his wife Jacquette Ruzé. His family was from Lucca (or Naples). His brother Raoul was an esoteric scholar and another brother, Martin, published in 1583 a collection of spiritual poems.

Catholic career
Jacques Spifame was at first regent at the college of Cardinal Le Moine. He was prosecutor of France, and successively rector of the University of Paris, chancellor, councilor in the Parlement from 1522, president of the chamber of inquiry in 1543, canon of Notre-Dame de Paris, dean of Saint-Marcel and Gassicourt, in 1531 first abbot commendatory of the abbey of Saint-Paul-sur-Vanne in Sens, whose archives he had destroyed in 1558 and finally, in 1544, vicar general of Charles, cardinal of Lorraine, archbishop of Reims. In 1546, he was appointed to the bishopric of Nevers.

Protestant  Career
Jacques was a State Councilor and attended the Estates General held in Paris. From that time, he favored the preaching of the doctrines of John Calvin.

Jacques Spifame lived for a long time in the greatest intimacy with Catherine de Gasperne, widow of Étienne le Hail, prosecutor at the Châtelet. He joined John Calvin in Geneva in 1559 and took the name of Passy, land which his father is lord. Passy gained attention in Geneva for his manners, his wit and his knowledge. Made a minister by Calvin himself, he was appointed, in 1561, pastor of the Protestant church of Issoudun. Calvin sent him to Orléans to be with the Prince de Condé.

In the early period after his arrival in Geneva, he married his mistress with whom he had a boy named André and a girl named Anne. One of his nephews having contested before the Parlement of Paris the legitimacy of these children's birth, Jacques made a false marriage certificate to win their case. At that time, Claude Servin, controller in the house of the Queen of Navarre, came to accuse him of certain malpractices and in the meantime, managed to be imprisoned with him. He was sentenced to death for adultery and was beheaded in 1566.

References

16th-century French Roman Catholic bishops
Year of birth unknown
Bishops of Nevers
Executed people from the Republic of Geneva
1566 deaths